The Remutaka Tunnel (spelled Rimutaka Tunnel before 2017) is a railway tunnel through New Zealand's Remutaka Range, between Maymorn, near Upper Hutt, and Featherston, on the Wairarapa Line.

It was the longest tunnel in New Zealand, superseding the Otira Tunnel in the South Island until the completion of the Kaimai Tunnel  near Tauranga in 1978. Remutaka remains the longest tunnel in New Zealand with scheduled passenger trains.

History 
The tunnel was built as part of a deviation to replace the costly Rimutaka Incline and its Fell engines.

Background 
The original route between Upper Hutt and Featherston was often the subject of criticism, even before it was built. In 1898 J. H. Dobson completed several surveys on behalf of the Public Works Department into possible alternatives. Conclusions reached in 1899 as a result of these surveys did little more than confirm previous opinions. One promising possibility was a  tunnel between Mangaroa and Cross Creek, which received so much attention that it nearly became the much-sought deviation. By 1900, however, it was realised that the cost of constructing such a tunnel could not be contemplated at that time.

It was not until the 1920s that significant campaigning for a replacement again prevailed on the government. In 1921-22 a feasibility study was conducted, including distances and estimated costs. Several routes were considered, including variations on previous ideas, but nothing more was done at the time; although a deviation of about 5 miles 48 chain (9 km) as the Wellington-Napier Line (Deviation) running generally to the south-eastward of the existing line was authorised by the Railways Authorisation Act, 1924.

The new Labour government of 1936 announced its intention to proceed with the Mangaroa to Cross Creek tunnel. Detailed surveys were completed in 1938/1939, but the project was again postponed due to World War II. The surveyed line was still shown on the 1947 edition of the one inch map.

After World War II it became a matter of urgency to consider a replacement. The H class locomotives were showing their age, the Incline was in bad shape, and maintenance costs were increasing. Between September 1945 and July 1947 four options were considered. It was accepted that no contour line could be the solution and that a tunnel under the Remutaka Ranges was the only satisfactory answer. The adopted route was the shortest route, a tunnel between Mangaroa and Lucena's Creek gully.

Construction
A contract for completing the tunnel was let to a consortium of Morrison-Knudsen and Downer (MKD) on 7 May 1951. The work commenced at the west end in July 1951 and at the east end in August. The contract was expected to be completed in four years, but the headings met on 20 April 1954 with the concrete lining finished a month later. The tunnel was partly built using full face operation rather than the traditional heading and bench excavation. Much of the fill removed on the West (Hutt) side was used for the Maymorn station site.

About 600 people were employed by MKD (about 300 to 400 at any one time), plus 14 MOW engineers and inspectors. Most were single men and lived in huts at camps or a bunkhouse at the Mangaroa or Featherston portals, which had cookhouses and mess halls plus 20 houses each for married staff. There were three fatalities during tunnelling.

New Zealand Railways took possession of the tunnel on 1 February 1955, which also included approach formations and bridge piers, at which time track laying commenced. By October 1955 the signalling and centralised traffic control equipment had been installed and all the track was laid, except for a short section near Upper Hutt where the old line crossed the new line at a higher level. All traffic on the Upper Hutt to Featherston section was suspended after the arrival of the Carterton Show Day excursion train at Upper Hutt on the evening of 29 October. Over the next three days the old formation was removed, the cutting for the new formation completed and the remainder of the track laid. On 3 November 1955, the new line was opened and two special trains travelled from Wellington to Speedy's Crossing to the inauguration ceremony.

Design 
The deviation's ruling grade is 1 in 70, compensated for curvature. The tightest curve is 400 metres (20 chain) radius. The tunnel rises at 1 in 400 from the western portal to the highest point on the deviation, roughly halfway through the tunnel, and then descends to the eastern portal at 1 in 180. When the tunnel holed through on 20 April 1954 the surveying error was found to be only .

After its completion, a  diameter vertical ventilation shaft was driven up from a point almost halfway through the tunnel. It reaches the surface beside the Remutaka Rail Trail near the former route's Pakuratahi Tunnel. Originally it had been envisaged that electric traction would be used by extending the 1500-volt DC overhead electrification beyond Upper Hutt to either Featherston or Masterton, but economic studies favoured diesel traction.

The new formation included two crossing loops; at the new Maymorn station (116 wagons) and the Rimutaka Loop (95 wagons) at the eastern portal of the tunnel. There are four bridges including a five-span  bridge across the Mangaroa River, and a tunnel and two underpasses near Maoribank.

On the eastern side where two short tunnels (220 metres (11 chain) and 180 metres (9 chain)) had been proposed through a spur, it was cheaper to lengthen the line by 140 metres (7 chain) and have open cuttings.

The construction of the Remutaka Tunnel consumed:
Gelignite: ,
Detonators: 327,850,
Diesel fuel: 3,182,264 litres (700,000 imp. gallons),
Cement: 26,163 tonnes (25,750 tons),
Aggregate: 87,837 metres3 (114,886 cu. yd), and
Timber: 15,820 metres3 (6,703,533 super feet).

Operation

Traction
The first locomotives to work through the tunnel were the DG class diesel-electric locomotives. The tunnel was too long for steam locomotives, making the Wairarapa Line the first fully dieselised line in New Zealand. Since 2015, the DFB class diesel-electric locomotives have been the primary traction used through the tunnel.

As a health and safety measure, staff on trains travelling through the tunnel carry gas detectors to detect the buildup of noxious gases. In May 2021, one of the morning peak Wairarapa Connection services was bus-replaced for a week, after two alarms detecting unsafe levels of nitrogen dioxide in the tunnel on one service.

There have been proposals to electrify the tunnel and the Wairarapa line as far north as Masterton as an extension of the Wellington suburban electrification. The tunnel was designed to enable catenary to be installed but this has not happened, and the catenary finishes just north of Upper Hutt station. In 2007, Greater Wellington Regional Council rejected a call to electrify the tunnel, on the basis that patronage did not justify the expenditure, and that the tunnel would "have to be made bigger."

Services

Passenger
Transdev Wellington operates passenger services named the Wairarapa Connection between Wellington and Masterton via the tunnel five times a day each way Monday to Thursday, six on Friday, and twice a day each way on Saturday, Sunday, and public holidays. Excursion trains also go through the tunnel, such as railway enthusiast specials and trains to the Toast Martinborough festival.

Steam-hauled excursions require diesel locomotives to provide motive power through the tunnel due to the danger from smoke in the tunnel's lengthy and confined conditions.

From 2014 diesel locomotives hauling passenger trains in long tunnels were required to have fire suppression equipment, following the Pike River Mine disaster inquiry. Initially, DC class locomotives were used for the Wairarapa Connection, then from 2015 the DFB class was used.

In 2021 an Upper Hutt man was charged with walking through the tunnel on 27 April, resulting in the cancellation of train services from 5.30 pm to 7 pm through the tunnel
 and an arrest warrant was issued after he failed to turn up in court.  He was eventually named in court for two charges.

Freight
The tunnel is used for freight from the Wairarapa to Wellington, notably logs from local pine forests and wood products from the Juken New Zealand Ltd timber mill at Waingawa, just south of Masterton.

See also 
Remutaka Rail Trail, which follows the old Rimutaka Incline.

References

Citations

Bibliography

 Anon. (1950) "The Rimutaka Incline and Deviation, New Zealand", Railway Magazine, 96 (592: August), p. 543–547

External links  

Rail transport in Wellington
Railway tunnels in New Zealand
Tunnels completed in 1955
1955 establishments in New Zealand
Transport buildings and structures in the Wellington Region